Ahn (Luxembourgish: Ohn) is a wine-growing village in the municipality of Wormeldange in the district and canton of Grevenmacher in the southwestern side of the Grand Duchy of Luxembourg. In 2005, the population is 208.

The bottom part of the village lies along the Moselle River on National Route 10.

Besides the National Route, Ahn is also on the road known as the CR142, which leads to Potaschberg through Flaxweiler from Ahn on the National Route 10.

History 
The village of Ahn was also known in the earlier years as Aen or Ayn.
The name of Ahn originated, etymologically, from Anam, the Celtic word adapted from paludem, the Latin word for marsh. A marsh in the Donwerbach was already present when the present village was built over it.

Various excavating efforts unearthed surprising finds dating from the Roman times, which hinted at a Roman presence in the surroundings. Construction of a house in 1873 unearthed a Roman grave with an urn. In 1875 a millstone at a vineyard between Ahn and Machtum was brought to the light. In 1970 construction on the road between Ahn and Machtum brought from the hillside the remains of a Roman bath to light. Ruins at the Pällemberg are the more recent proof of the Roman patrimony of Machtum and Ahn.

In the records, the estate of Ahn was mentioned for the first time in May 1245 as the “Curia de Ana” [Latin, “Anna’s Hall”). It was by the will of Alexander, Herr [Lord] von Soleuvre (Zolwer in German and Luxembourgish), it was determined that his two nephews, the knights Anselm and Dietrich, after his death, would have the revenue, about 200 Metzer pounds, from the inheritance of the farms of Ahn, Flaxweiler, Tétange, Kayl an der Korn, which had to be vacated by the paupers. The Moselle River properties of the Herrn von Soleuvre were previously the domains of the Counts of Luxembourg, who had worked as the bailiffs for the Archbishop of Trier. For that, the Soleuvres were adopted as the next owners of Ahn.

The names of some of the owners of the village in the course of the next decade were documented by the following written excerpts:

In January 1358, Wenceslaus I, Duke of Luxembourg, granted Grevenmacher the right to have a weekly market. Representing one of the 41 villages from the area of the judicial district of Grevenmacher, among other things, Ahn was obligated to be present at the market on Thursdays.

By the agreement of 9 July 1376, Heinrich, Herr von Limpach, sold to Frau [Lady] Sophia von Soleuvre, the wife of Ludwig von Macheren, the Provost [Probst] of Luxembourg, the villages of Flaxweiler and Ahn. They were also documented as part-time owners of the dominions of Dasburg, Réiser, Hamm and Grevenmacher. After the pestilence of 1545, Ahn, along with several other villages of the Moselle River, was destroyed in 1552 by King Henry II of France and his ally, Margrave Albert of Brandenburg-Kulmbach. In 1596 it was a great flood that devastated Ahn.

On 17 October 1626, on this day, the estate of Ahn was where the dominion of Wincheringen received, by the decree of the Provincial Council of Luxembourg, the writ of administrative rights [Gewohnheitsrecht], also called Weistum.

On the orders of the Empress of Austria, Maria Theresa, a census was made in 1766 of all the properties in the Duchy of Luxembourg. The landed properties were at that moment were composed of the following areas:

With them were known to be a mill and 19 households with 105 residents. It is known that there were at that time only three vineyards in Ahn: op der Uet, am Hang and am Pällemberg. Ahn was primarily a village of farmers and vintners.

Vineyards of Ahn 
From the 19th to 20th centuries, during that time, Luxembourg belonged to the Deutsche Zollverein, which brought the prosperity. Many of the wine and grapes were exported over the border to Germany. They were mainly the Elbling, then also known as “Kleinberger”.

The Riesling grapes until then were even more rare. Only just in 1932, crops of nutmeg and spice were grown. The Germans were using them for the production of their own brand of the first acidic Luxembourger wine or champagne. Also the Ahner themselves at the beginning of the 20th century were starting to produce the first champagne. The population of Ahn is now up to 400 people. Many of the present winehouses, the new church and the cemetery were built at that time.

After the First World War, at the end of the Deutsche Zollverein, the local viniculture went into the decline, which lasted until well after the Second World War. To Ahn as well as the whole Moselle River Valley, land management played even greater its important role in the viniculture. The vintners had come to recognize that this might be their opportunity to set the quality as well as the quantity. For that, Ahn was already by the Fifties going through voluntary reorganization with the exchange of little parcels. So it was natural that the consolidation of the vineyards of Ahn was the first, which was realized by the Consolidation Act of 25 May 1964. For this consolidation to work, the whole zone had to be aligned. By the labors, which lasted for something like five years, the earth had to be moved and leveled, new roads had to be built with retaining walls, water pipes had to be installed for the total amount of 156 million francs. The partial planting of the new channels cost more than 618,000 francs per hectare, of which the National Agrarfong in Brussels, which had founded the Channel Construction Cooperative [Riewenubau Genossenschaft] specifically for that, paid a great part. The results were:

	
Today, the most important vineyards of Ahn are:
 Gellebour
 Palmberg
 Pietert
 Vogelsang

See also
 List of villages in Luxembourg

References

External links 
 (ge, fr) Official Site of the Municipality of Wormeldange: Ahn

Wormeldange
Villages in Luxembourg